Garden of the Moon is a 1938 American comedy film directed by Busby Berkeley and screenplay by Jerry Wald and story by Richard Macaulay. The film stars Pat O'Brien, Margaret Lindsay, John Payne, Johnnie Davis, Melville Cooper and Isabel Jeans. The film was released by Warner Bros. on October 1, 1938.

Plot
When Rudy Vallee has an accident and cannot meet his engagement at the Garden of the Moon nightclub, Toni Blake, the club's press agent, convinces owner John Quinn to hire young bandleader Don Vincente. Don and his band fly out to California from New York for the engagement, but Don almost quits when he learns he is supposed to perform with a woman singer because, in the past, women singers have caused rifts among the musicians. Don's defiance enrages Quinn, who announces that he will end the engagement as soon as Vallee recovers from his accident. The band, which plays swing music, is very popular with the public. Nonetheless, Quinn forces Don to use the woman singer. Don surrounds her with horns so that she cannot be heard, and Quinn retaliates by turning off Don's microphone. Nonplussed, Don sings without it. Hoping to find him a sponsor, so his trip to California will not be a total waste, Toni convinces a chewing gum manufacturer to listen to Don's broadcast. When Quinn hears about her plans, he determines to destroy the broadcast and the next day fires Don. Knowing that Quinn is fascinated by royalty, Toni plants a story about Don's friendship with the Maharajah of Sund. Soon Don is back at work, where Quinn throws a big party for the Maharajah. Toni's plans have succeeded, but Maurice, the maitre-d', almost ruins them when he recognizes the Maharajah as a bad waiter who once worked for him. Despite Don and Toni's efforts, Quinn learns the truth, but Toni convinces him that he will look like a fool if he takes revenge on Don. Don has been so successful that the owners of the hotel where the Garden is located want to sign him for twenty-six weeks. Don refuses to sign the contract, however, because the gum manufacturer has offered him a radio program. Quinn begs Toni to help him meet his obligations to the owners, and she convinces Don to do the radio broadcast from Hollywood. Mistakenly, he later decides that Toni is in league with Quinn and quits. Desperately, Quinn enlists the help of gossip columnist Jimmie Fidler, who warns Quinn over the radio that gangsters are out to kill him. Quinn fakes a shooting, and on his supposed death bed, he begs Don to stay. His ruse works and soon Quinn is back to work, as ornery as ever, with Don as his bandleader.

Cast 
 Pat O'Brien as John Quinn
 Margaret Lindsay as Toni Blake
 John Payne as Don Vincente
 Johnnie Davis as Slappy Harris
 Melville Cooper as Maurice
 Isabel Jeans as Mrs. Lornay
 Mabel Todd as Mary Stanton
 Penny Singleton as Miss Calder
 Dick Purcell as Rick Fulton
 Curt Bois as Maharajah of Sund
 Granville Bates as Angus McGillicuddy
 Edward McWade as Peter McGillicuddy
 Larry Williams as Trent
 Ray Mayer as Musician (piano)
 Jerry Colonna as Musician (trombone)
 Joe Venuti as Musician (violin)
 Jimmy Fidler as Jimmie Fidler

References

External links 
 
 
 
 

1938 films
Warner Bros. films
American comedy films
1938 comedy films
Films directed by Busby Berkeley
Films scored by Heinz Roemheld
American black-and-white films
1930s English-language films
1930s American films